Carabus obsoletus fossulifer is a subspecies of ground beetle in the subfamily Carabinae that might be extinct throughout Europe.

References

obsoletus fossulifer
Beetles described in 1893